Stephanie De Landre is an Australian professional wrestler currently signed to Impact Wrestling, where she competes under her real name.

She previously wrestled in WWE, where she performed on the NXT 2.0 brand under the ring name Persia Pirotta. She began her career under the name FaceBrooke. Before signing with WWE, Pirotta had previously been signed to Melbourne City Wrestling and Newcastle Pro Wrestling.

Early life 
Pirotta was born in Melbourne, Victoria, and raised in Avalon, New South Wales, a northern suburb of Sydney. She is of Maltese descent.

Professional wrestling career 
It was reported on 14 March 2021, Steph De Lander was one of two Australian wrestlers signed by WWE. Under the ring name "Persia Pirotta", she made her NXT debut as the close friend of Indi Hartwell who had come all the way from Australia for Hartwell's wedding with Dexter Lumis. On 26 October during the NXT: Halloween Havoc television special, Pirotta and Hartwell teamed again to compete in a Triple Threat Scareway To Hell Ladder match against Toxic Attraction (Gigi Dolin & Jacy Jayne) and the reigning NXT Women's Tag Team Champions Io Shirai & Zoey Stark. She had her first victory in WWE on 16 November episode of NXT, defeating Gabby Stephens & Jenny Levy in a two-on-one handicap match.

After she returned on January 2022, Pirotta and Hartwell started a feud with Toxic Attraction which resulted in a match for women's tag team titles at Vengeance Day where they were unsuccessful in winning the match. She was released by WWE in April 2022.

In February 2023, she made her televised debut with Impact Wrestling as Steph De Lander.

Championships and accomplishments 
 Melbourne City Wrestling
 MCW Women's Championship (1 time, inaugural)
 MCW Women's Championship Invitational Tournament (2019)
 Newcastle Pro Wrestling
 Newy Pro Women's Championship (1 time)
 Newy Pro Invictus Tournament Winner (2020)
 Venom Pro Wrestling
 VPW Women's Championship (1 time)
 World Series Wrestling
 World Series Wrestling Women's Championship (1 time)<ref>{{cite web|url=Card « WSW unleash hell - tag 4 « events database « cagematch - the ... (no date). Available at: https://www.cagematch.net/?id=1&nr=361988 (Accessed: March 15, 2023).

References

External links 
 
 
 

Living people
Australian female professional wrestlers
Australian people of Maltese descent
Sportspeople from Sydney
Sportswomen from New South Wales
Australian expatriate sportspeople in the United States
Expatriate professional wrestlers
1997 births
21st-century professional wrestlers